Achachi Qala (Aymara for "gigantic stone", also spelled Achachi Khala) is a mountain in the Bolivian Andes which reaches a height of approximately . It is located in the La Paz Department, Loayza Province, Cairoma Municipality.

References 

Mountains of La Paz Department (Bolivia)